Johann Heinrich Strack (6 July 1805, Bückeburg – 13 June 1880, Berlin) was a German architect of the Schinkelschule. His notable works include the Berlin Victory Column.

Life and work 
His father, was a painter of portraits and vedute. His mother's brother was Johann Heinrich Tischbein, a famous portrait and history painter. Between 1824 and 1838, he studied at both the Bauakademie and the Prussian Academy of Arts. During that time, he passed the surveyor's examination (1825), the construction manager examination (1827) and the Master Builder's examination (1838), which qualified him to be an inspector. 

He also assisted Karl Friedrich Schinkel, furnishing an apartment for Crown Prince Friedrich Wilhelm at the Berliner Schloss; and Friedrich August Stüler, in renovating the Ordenspalais. The latter resulted in a lifetime friendship. His first independent employment was as a construction manager, for renovating the Prinz-Albrecht-Palais (1829–1830). He worked as an freelance manager and architect from 1832 to 1837.

He began teaching at the Prussian Academy in 1839, and was appointed a Professor there in 1841. The following year, he became a building inspector for the Court, in service to then-Prince Wilhelm. In 1850, he became a member of the new "Technical Building Deputation". He succeeded Stüler as a Professor at the Bauakademie in 1854. He also taught drawing to Wilhelm's son, Friedrich, and accompanied him on a trip to Italy.

In 1862, during excavations in Athens, Strack, Ernst Curtius and Karl Bötticher discovered the Theatre of Dionysus, near the Acropolis. Three years later, he was accepted as a foreign member of the  Académie des Beaux-Arts, and began writings texts on architectural subjects. When he retired in 1876, then-Emperor Wilhelm I appointed him "Architect to the Emperor". 

Selected works 

 1845–1849: Babelsberg Palace, completion after the death of Ludwig Persius
 1854: Refurbishment of the Old Palace, Unter den Linden, Berlin
 1853–1856: St. Andrew's Church, formerly Stralauer Platz, Friedrichshain
 1856–1858: Expansion of the Kronprinzenpalais, Unter den Linden, Berlin
 1867–1868: Gatehouses of the Brandenburg Gate
 1869–1873: Berlin Victory Column, now in Großer Stern in the Tiergarten in Berlin 
 1866–1875: Construction of the Alte Nationalgalerie, Berlin
 1853–1856: Flatow Tower in Babelsberg Park
 1870/1871: Redesign of the Berlin Gerichtslaube in the park of Babelsberg Palace

Sources 
 
 Franz Jahn, Hans Vollmer; "Strack, Johann Heinrich", In: Allgemeines Lexikon der Bildenden Künstler von der Antike bis zur Gegenwart, Vol. 32: Stephens–Theodotos, E. A. Seemann, Leipzig, 1938
 Wochenschrift d. Architekten-Vereins zu Berlin, Vol.2, 1907, Heymanns

External links

1805 births
1880 deaths
People from Bückeburg
Academic staff of the Prussian Academy of Arts
Recipients of the Pour le Mérite (civil class)
19th-century German architects